Radek Dosoudil (born 20 June 1983) is a Czech footballer, who plays as a centre back. He last played for Dinamo Tbilisi.

Club career
He began his football career as a junior in 1998 with FK Mladá Boleslav, where his talent earned him a move to the famous Sparta Prague in 1998. He had a short spell in Turkey, where he played for Denizlispor in 2005. In summer 2007 he joined the slovak club Artmedia Petržalka, with which he won the double and played in the qualification round for the Champions League, where Artmedia lost to Juventus. In January 2009 he was transferred to local rivals Slovan Bratislava.

He previously played for FK Jablonec and Slavia Prague.

In 2013, Dosoudil suffered a broken leg following a challenge from Sparta Prague striker Léonard Kweuke in a Czech Cup match. Kweuke was banned for a league-record 12 matches for the incident.

International career
Dosoudil represented the Czech Republic at U21 level. He also played for the Czech Republic at the U-20 World Cup in 2003.

References 

1983 births
Living people
Czech footballers
Czech Republic youth international footballers
Czech Republic under-21 international footballers
Association football defenders
FK Mladá Boleslav players
AC Sparta Prague players
FK Jablonec players
Czech expatriate footballers
Expatriate footballers in Turkey
Czech expatriate sportspeople in Turkey
Czech expatriate sportspeople in Georgia (country)
Denizlispor footballers
SK Slavia Prague players
Expatriate footballers in Slovakia
Czech expatriate sportspeople in Slovakia
Slovak Super Liga players
FC Petržalka players
ŠK Slovan Bratislava players
Süper Lig players
Erovnuli Liga players
Czech First League players
Sportspeople from Mladá Boleslav
FC Dinamo Tbilisi players